Castel Paganica is a frazione of Montereale, in the Province of L'Aquila in the Abruzzo, region of Italy. It is located inside the Gran Sasso e Monti della Laga National Park. 

Frazioni of Montereale